Derobrachus megacles is a species of beetle in the family Cerambycidae. It was described by Henry Walter Bates in 1884. It is found in Mexico and Guatemala.

Description
This is a large brown beetle about 64 mm long with antennae that are about half the length of the body. There are short spines on the thorax. The elytra are brown.

References

Prioninae
Beetles described in 1884